The 1961–62 season is Real Madrid Club de Fútbol's 59th season in existence and the club's 30th consecutive season in the top flight of Spanish football. 

The season saw Real Madrid win the domestic double and get agonizingly close to clinching its first ever treble (similarly to the 1957–58 season), only to be defeated by Benfica in an exhilarating European Cup final.

Summary
The club won its eight title ever, second in a row. Head coach Miguel Muñoz started the renewal of the squad with Araquistáin as goalkeeper, Pachín reinforcing the defensive line playing along Santamaría, Miera and Isidro, also Pedro Casado competing . The midfield was covered by Luis Del Sol and Felix Ruiz. Meanwhile, ageing forwards Di Stefano and Puskas were aimed with passes by Gento and Justo Tejada.

Also, the club won the 1962 Copa del Generalísimo Final, defeating Sevilla 2–1 and clinching the club's first domestic double. It was the only Copa del Generalísimo that Alfredo Di Stéfano won in 11 campaigns. The squad reached the 1962 European Cup Final, where it was defeated by Portuguese side and European incumbents Benfica 3–5 (with all Madrid's goals scored by Puskás) thanks to a superb second half, with star forward Eusébio scoring 2 goals. Had Madrid won the European Cup in May, its subsequent triumph in the Copa del Generalísimo would have secured the club its first ever continental treble, something no club had achieved at the time. As of 2022, Real Madrid still has not won a treble.

Players

Transfers

Winter

Competitions

Overview

La Liga

League table

Position by round

Matches

Copa del Rey

Round of 32

Round of 16

Quarter-finals

Semi-finals

Final

European Cup

Preliminary round

First round

Quarter-finals

Semi-finals

Final

Statistics

Players statistics

References

 BDFútbol

Real Madrid CF seasons
Spanish football championship-winning seasons
Real Madrid